Brent Simon (born June 6, 1978) is a keyboard player best known for his videos "The Bittorrent Song" and "Space Camp". He achieved popularity due to his unique melodies and lyrics. There is a documentary titled Brentumentary that explores an average day in Simon's life. Brentumentary features him playing Space Camp and The Bittorrent song. Simon has been featured on G4 several times, the Thisisaknife web show, and on Jimmy Kimmel Live!. Brent works in Mantua, Ohio, at his family's local grocery store.

Discography 
 Brentumentary Soundtrack (2005)
 Project: Coldfire (2005) (EP)
 Seven of Nine (2006)

References

External links
The Slow Mutants YouTube Channel

Living people
1978 births
People from Mantua, Ohio